"Just Good Friends" is a song from American recording artist Michael Jackson's 1987 album Bad. The song is one of two duets on the album, the other being "I Just Can't Stop Loving You". The song features Jackson and Stevie Wonder quarrelling over a girl in a light, cheerful manner. "Just Good Friends" is the fifth track on Bad with a duration of 4:06. It is the only song from the album to have never been released as a single. "Just Good Friends" is one of only two songs on Bad which were not written by Jackson himself, the other being "Man in the Mirror". The song was written and composed by the '80s song writing-partnership of Terry Britten and Graham Lyle.

Reception
Rolling Stone criticized "Just Good Friends" as being "the only mediocrity" on Bad. The reviewer attributed this to the fact that "Just Good Friends" is one of only two songs not actually written by Jackson on the album. Rolling Stone commented that the Stevie Wonder-duet starts well, but "devolves into a chin-bobbing cheerfulness that is unforced but also, sadly, unearned."

Quincy Jones was also very critical of the song: “I made a mistake on the duet with him and Stevie [“Just Good Friends,” written by Terry Britten and Graham Lyle]. That didn’t work.”

Credits
 Written and composed by Terry Britten and Graham Lyle
 Vocal duet with Michael Jackson and Stevie Wonder
 Synthesizer solo: Stevie Wonder
 Drums: Ollie E. Brown, Humberto Gatica and Bruce Swedien
 Drum programming: Cornelius Mims
 Rhythm guitar and wah-wah guitar solo: Michael Landau
 Saxophones: Kim Hutchcroft and Larry Williams
 Trumpets: Gary Grant and Jerry Hey
 Percussion: Paulinho Da Costa
 Synclavier: Christopher Currell
 Synthesizers: Michael Boddicker, Rhett Lawrence, Greg Phillinganes and Larry Williams
 Rhythm, synthesizer and vocal arrangements by Terry Britten, Graham Lyle and Quincy Jones
 Horn arrangement by Jerry Hey

See also
 "The Girl Is Mine" – a 1982 song by Michael Jackson and Paul McCartney with similar subject matter

References

1987 songs
Michael Jackson songs
Stevie Wonder songs
Songs written by Terry Britten
Songs written by Graham Lyle
Song recordings produced by Michael Jackson
Song recordings produced by Quincy Jones
Male vocal duets